Wollumbin National Park (previously known as 'Mount Warning National Park') is a national park located in northern New South Wales, Australia,  north of Sydney near the border with the state of Queensland. It surrounds Mount Warning, part of a remnant caldera of a much larger extinct volcano (the Tweed volcano). The park is administered by the NSW National Parks and Wildlife Service.  The park is part of the Scenic Rim Important Bird Area, identified as such by BirdLife International because of its importance in the conservation of several species of threatened birds. In addition to numerous bird species, carpet python, land mullet, eastern small-eyed snake, lace monitor, black-bellied marsh snake and long-nosed potoroo can be found here.

Wollumbin rises to 1157 meters above sea level.

History

The park incorporates lands of traditional significance to the local Bundjalung people.  The local Aboriginal name for the mountain is "Wollumbin"; meaning, "cloud-catcher", or alternatively "fighting chief of the mountains".  The mountain's English name was bestowed on it by Lieutenant James Cook in May 1770, as his expedition in command of the Endeavour passed it by on their route northwards along the eastern coastline of Australia. The designation "Mount Warning" was meant to indicate the danger of the offshore reefs they encountered.  The park was reserved for public recreation in 1928 and dedicated as a national park in 1966.  The Park is part of the Shield Volcano Group of the World Heritage Site Gondwana Rainforests of Australia inscribed in 1986 and added to the Australian National Heritage List in 2007.

See also
 Protected areas of New South Wales
 High Conservation Value Old Growth forest

References

External links
 MountWarning.com
 NSW AUSTRALIA ACCOMMODATION AND TOURIST GUIDE site
 1985 UNESCO Application Summary Document - The Tweed Volcano Group
 An alternative historical view of the naming of this mountain based on traditional owners perspective

National parks of New South Wales
Protected areas established in 1967
Gondwana Rainforests of Australia
Forests of New South Wales
1967 establishments in Australia
Important Bird Areas of New South Wales